FC Mostovik-Primorye Ussuriysk is an association football team from Ussuriysk, Russia. It played professionally for a single season in 1993, taking 11th place in Zone 7 of the Russian Second Division. In 2010, the club returned to the Russian Second Division. It was liquidated after the 2011-12 season due to lack of financing.

Team name history
1992–2007: FC Lokomotiv Ussuriysk
2008: FC Mostovik-Lokomotiv Ussuriysk
2009–present: FC Mostovik-Primorye Ussuriysk

External links
 Team history at KLISF
 Official website

Association football clubs established in 1992
Association football clubs disestablished in 2012
1992 establishments in Russia
2012 disestablishments in Russia
Defunct football clubs in Russia
Sport in Primorsky Krai